The computer-on-module for high performance compute (COM-HPC) form factor standard targets high I/O and computer performance levels. Each COM-HPC module integrates core CPU and memory functionality and input and output including USB up to Gen 4, audio (MIPI SoundWire, I2S and DMIC), graphics, (PCI Express) up to Gen. 5, and Ethernet up to 25 Gbits/s per lane. All I/O signals are mapped to two high density, high speed and low profile connectors on the bottom side of the module. COM-HPC employs a mezzanine-based approach. The COM modules plug into a carrier or base board that is typically customized to the application. Over time, the COM-HPC mezzanine modules can be upgraded to newer, backwards-compatible versions. COM-HPC targets Industrial, Military/Aerospace, Gaming, Medical, Transportation, IoT, and General Computing embedded applications and even scales up to RAM and performance hungry server or edge server applications.

History
The PICMG work-group officially started in October 2018. The hardware specification passed the PICMG member review in December 2020. The official release was expected for January 2021.

Types
There are 2 different pin outs defined in the specification.

Note 1: The DC power input for Client Type Modules is defined as wide range 8-20 Volt input.Note 2: The DC power input for Server Type Modules is defined as 12V only (11.4-12.6 Volt) input.

Size
The specification defines 5 module sizes:
The sizes A, B and C are typical Client Type sizes.
 Size A: 
 Size B: 
 Size C: 
The larger D and E sizes are typical Server Type sizes to support full size DRAM modules
 Size D: 
 Size E:

Specification
The COM-HPC specification is hosted by PICMG. It is not freely available but may be purchased from the PICMG website.
PICMG provides a preview version for free download.
The COM-HPC hardware specification will be released Jan 2021.
Further COM-HPC related documents will be released in 2021
 Carrier Board Design Guide for Ethernet KR
 Full Carrier Board Design Guide
 Platform Management Specification
 Embedded EEPROM Specification (EEEP)

See also
 ETX
 XTX
 Qseven
 SMARC
 COM Express

References

External links

 COM-HPC Overview PICMG
 COM-HPC Overview ADLINK
  COM-HPC Overview congatec
 COM-HPC Overview Kontron
 COM-HPC Overview Samtec
 COM-HPC Overview Advantech
 COM-HPC Overview Avnet
 COM-HPC Overview Comtel
 COM-HPC Overview Eurotech
 COM-HPC Overview Seco
 COM-HPC Overview Trenz

Motherboard form factors
Computer hardware standards